Bennie Daniels Jr. (born June 17, 1932), is an American former professional baseball pitcher, who played in Major League Baseball (MLB) for the Pittsburgh Pirates (–) and Washington Senators (–). He threw right-handed and batted left-handed. During his nine-year big league career, Daniels appeared in 230 games pitched, with 139 starts, and compiled 45 wins, 471 strikeouts, five complete games, five shutouts and five saves, and a 4.44 earned run average (ERA). He allowed 1,004 hits and 383 bases on balls in 997 innings pitched.

Born in Tuscaloosa, Alabama, Daniels graduated from Compton High School in Southern California. After spending the – seasons in military service, he continued to move up through Pittsburgh's farm system. After a good 17–8 season with the Hollywood Stars of the Pacific Coast League, the Bucs called Daniels up in September 1957.

Daniels enjoyed the distinction of starting the last game played in Ebbets Field by the Brooklyn Dodgers, on September 24, 1957. The Pirates were defeated by the Dodgers’ Danny McDevitt, 2–0.

On May 23, 1960, at Forbes Field, Daniels' single in the second inning against Sandy Koufax was the only hit the Pirates got against Koufax, who won 1–0, denying the future Hall-of-Famer what would have been the first of five no-hitters.

On December 16, 1960, Daniels was involved in one of the first trades made by the expansion Washington Senators, set to enter the American League the following April. The four-player deal sent veteran southpaw pitcher Bobby Shantz to the Pirates for Daniels and two others, infielders Harry Bright and R. C. Stevens. Daniels led the 1961 Senators' pitching staff in games won (12), complete games (11), strikeouts (110), and innings pitched (212, tied with Joe McClain). The following year, manager Mickey Vernon selected Daniels to start the  Presidential Opener on April 9—the first one played at the new DC Stadium. He went the distance and defeated the Detroit Tigers, 4–1, allowing only five hits. He pitched for Washington through , going 37–60 (4.14 ERA) in 177 games for the perennial second-division club. He retired from baseball after the  season, which he spent with the Triple-A Hawaii Islanders.

Later life
After retiring from baseball, Daniels returned to Compton, California, with his wife, Jimmie Sue Daniels. He has two children, Michael and Vickie Daniels. Bennie Daniels’ daughter, Vickie died, in September 2017. He currently resides in Compton.

References

External links

Bennie Daniels at SABR (Baseball BioProject)

1937 births
Living people
20th-century African-American sportspeople
21st-century African-American people
African-American baseball players
Baseball players from Alabama
Billings Mustangs players
Columbus Jets players
Compton High School alumni
Great Falls Electrics players
Hawaii Islanders players
Hollywood Stars players
Lincoln Chiefs players
Major League Baseball pitchers
Modesto Reds players
Pittsburgh Pirates players
Sportspeople from Tuscaloosa, Alabama
Washington Senators (1961–1971) players